Marcus Ambivulus was the 2nd Roman Prefect of the province of Judea, comprising biblical Judea and Samaria.

History
Originally a cavalry officer, he succeeded Coponius in 9 and ruled the area until 12, when he was succeeded by Annius Rufus. Josephus noted his tenure in the Antiquities of the Jews 18.31.

See also
 Roman administration of Judaea (AD 6–135)
 Roman Procurator coinage

References

1st-century Romans
1st-century Roman governors of Judaea
Roman governors of Judaea